This is a complete list of former and current Phoenix Suns players organized by jersey number.  Players who have worn more than one number while playing for this team will appear multiple times.  Under each number, players are listed in chronological order, with the player who most recently wore the number listed last.  Players who were at one time on the Suns roster but never actually appeared in a regular season or a playoff game for the team are not included.

0
Jerrod Mustaf (1991–1994)
Randy Brown (2002–2003)
Walter McCarty (2005)
Aaron Brooks (2011)
Michael Beasley (2012-2013)
Orlando Johnson (2016)
Marquese Chriss (2016–2018)
Isaiah Canaan (2018)
Jawun Evans (2018-2019)
Jalen Lecque (2019-2020)
Ty-Shon Alexander (2020-2021)
Torrey Craig (2022-)

00
Tony Delk (2000–2002)
JaVale McGee (2021-2022)

1
Dennis Layton (1971–1973)
Cedric Ceballos (1997–1998)
Penny Hardaway (1999–2004)
Yuta Tabuse (2004)
Smush Parker (2005)
Dijon Thompson (2005–2006)
Amar'e Stoudemire (2006–2010)
Josh Childress (2010-2012)
Goran Dragić (2012-2015)
A. J. Price (2015)
Devin Booker (2015-)

2
James Bailey (1987–1988)
Joe Barry Carroll (1991)
Mark Bryant (1996–1999)
Shawn Respert (1999)
Randy Livingston (1999–2000)
Elliot Perry (1994–1996) (2000–2001)
Joe Johnson (2002–2005)
Tim Thomas (2006)
Marcus Banks (2006–2008)
Gordan Giriček (2008)
Goran Dragić (2008-2011)
Ronnie Price (2011-2012)
Wesley Johnson (2012-2013)
Eric Bledsoe (2013-2017)
Isaiah Canaan (2017-2017)
Élie Okobo (2018–2020)
Langston Galloway (2020-2021)
Elfrid Payton (2017-2018, 2021-2022)
Josh Okogie (2022-)

3
Grant Gondrezick (1985–1987)
Kenny Battle (1989–1991)
Frank Johnson (1992–1994)
Rex Chapman (1996–2000)
Stephon Marbury (2001–2004)
Quentin Richardson (2004–2005)
Boris Diaw (2005–2008)
Jared Dudley (2008–2013) (2016–2018)
Ish Smith (2013-2014)
Isaiah Thomas (2014-2015)
Brandon Knight (2015-2016)
Trevor Ariza (2018)
Kelly Oubre Jr. (2018-2020)
Chris Paul (2020-)

4
Tom Van Arsdale (1976–1977)
Kyle Macy (1979–1985)
Steve Kerr (1988–1989)
Herman Henry (1994)
Aaron Swinson (1994)
Michael Finley (1995–1996)
Brooks Thompson (1997–1998)
Dennis Scott (1998)
Gerald Brown (1999)
Alton Ford (2001–2003)
Donnell Harvey (2003–2004)
Jackson Vroman (2004–2005)
Sean Marks (2006–2008)
Courtney Sims (2009)
Stromile Swift (2009)
Marcin Gortat (2010-2013)
Tyler Ennis (2014–2015)
Tyson Chandler (2015-2018)
Quincy Acy (2019)
Jevon Carter (2019-2021)
Aaron Holiday (2022)
Duane Washington Jr. (2022-2023)

5
Dick Van Arsdale (1968–1977) (number retired)

6
Walter Davis (1977–1988) (number retired)

7
Butch Feher (1977)
Dudley Bradley (1981–1982)
Rory White (1982–1983)
Mike Sanders (1983–1984)
Bernard Thompson (1985–1988)
Kevin Johnson (1988–1998) (2000) (number retired)

8
John McCullough (1981)
Rick Robey (1983–1986)
Eddie Johnson (1987–1990)
Tim Kempton (1992–1994)
Trevor Ruffin (1994–1995)
Mario Bennett (1995–1996)
Pat Garrity (1998–1999)
Oliver Miller (1999–2000)
Vinny Del Negro (2001)
Jalen Rose (2006–2007)
D. J. Strawberry (2007–2008)
Channing Frye (2009-2014)
Jerel McNeal (2015)
Bryce Cotton (2015–2016)
Tyler Ulis (2016–2018)
George King (2018)
Frank Kaminsky (2019-2022)
Terrence Ross (2023-)

9
Dan Majerle (1988–1995) (2001–2002) (number retired)

10
Dick Snyder (1968–1969)
Fred Taylor (1970–1971)
Jeff Webb (1972)
Phil Lumpkin (1975–1976)
Don Buse (1977–1980)
Rod Foster (1983–1986)
Greg Grant (1989–1990)
Duane Cooper (1993–1994)
David Wood (1996)
Sam Cassell (1996)
Dexter Boney (1997)
Milt Palacio (2002)
Diante Garrett (2012-2013)
Leandro Barbosa (2003–2010, 2014)
Zoran Dragić (2014-2015)
Seth Curry (2015)
Sonny Weems (2015-2016)
Chase Budinger (2016)
Derrick Jones Jr. (2016–2017)
Shaquille Harrison (2018)
Emanuel Terry (2019)
Ty Jerome (2019-2020)
Jalen Smith (2020-2022)
Damion Lee (2022-)

11
Neil Johnson (1968–1970)
Clem Haskins (1970–1974)
Johnny High (1982–1984)
Mike Sanders (1983–1988)
Kevin Johnson (1988)
Alex Stivrins (1992)
Wesley Person (1994–1997)
Jimmy Oliver (1999)
Todd Day (1999–2000)
Joe Crispin (2002)
Zarko Cabarkapa (2003–2005)
Pat Burke (2005–2007)
Dee Brown (2008–2009)
Markieff Morris (2011–2016)
Brandon Knight (2016-2018)
Jamal Crawford (2018-2019)
Ricky Rubio (2019-2020)
Abdel Nader (2020-2022)
Jock Landale (2022-)

12
Eddie Biedenbach (1968)
Pat Riley (1975–1976)
Ted McClain (1979)
Johnny High (1979)
Rafael Addison (1986–1987)
Winston Crite (1987–1988)
Richard Dumas (1994-1995)
Toby Bailey (1998–2000)
Howard Eisley (2004)
Andre Barrett (2006)
Mickaël Piétrus (2010-2011)
Kendall Marshall (2012-2013)
T. J. Warren (2014-2019)
Jared Harper (2019-2020)
Torrey Craig (2021)
Ish Wainright (2021-)

13
Gus Johnson (1972)
Luc Longley (1999–2000)
Steve Nash (1996–1998) (2004-2012) (number retired)

14
Scott English (1972–1973)
Keith Erickson (1973–1977)
Alvin Scott (1977–1985)
Jeff Hornacek (1986–1992)
Tony Smith (1995–1996)
Terrence Rencher (1996)
Chris Dudley (2000–2001)
Charlie Bell (2001)
Dan Langhi (2002–2003)
Antonio McDyess (2004)
Sean Singletary (2008)
Luis Scola (2012-2013)
Gerald Green (2013-2015)
Ronnie Price (2015-2016, 2017)
Greg Monroe (2017-2018)
De'Anthony Melton (2018-2019)
Cheick Diallo (2019-2020)
Landry Shamet (2021-)

15
Michael Holton (1984–1985)
Sedric Toney (1986)
Steve Burtt (1992)
Danny Manning (1994–1999)
Vinny Del Negro (2001)
Daniel Santiago (2001–2002)
Cezary Trybanski (2003–2004)
Josh Davis (2006)
Nikoloz Tskitishvili (2006)
Robin Lopez (2008-2012)
Marcus Morris (2013-2015)
Alan Williams (2016-2018)
Ryan Anderson (2018-2019)
Cameron Payne (2020-)

16
Rodney Knowles (1968)
Lamar Green (1969–1974)
Georgi Glouchkov (1985–1986)
Tyler Johnson (2019-2020)

17
Devin Durrant (1985)
Horacio Llamas (1997–1999)
Mario Elie (2000–2001)
Smush Parker (2005)
Paul Shirley (2004–2005)
Louis Amundson (2008-2010)
P. J. Tucker (2012-2017)

18
Curtis Perry (1974–1978)
John "Hot Rod" Williams (1995–1998)
Bismack Biyombo (2022-)

19
Alvin Sims (1999)
Raja Bell (2005–2008)
Hedo Türkoğlu (2010)
Leandro Barbosa (2016–2017)

20
Corky Calhoun (1972–1974)
Maurice Lucas (1982–1985)
Rumeal Robinson (1997)
Marko Milic (1997–1999)
Jumaine Jones (2006–2007)
Jarron Collins (2009-2010)
Garret Siler (2010-2011)
Jermaine O'Neal (2012-2013)
Archie Goodwin (2013-2016)
Josh Jackson (2017-2019)
Dario Šarić (2019-2023)

21
George Wilson (1968–1969)
Dennis Awtrey (1974–1978)
Truck Robinson (1979–1982)
Micheal Williams (1989)
Richard Dumas (1991–1994)
Antonio Lang (1994–1995)
George McCloud (1997–1999)
Ruben Garces (2000–2001)
Robert Archibald (2003)
Jim Jackson (2005–2006)
Dwayne Jones (2010)
Hakim Warrick (2010-2012)
Alex Len (2013-2018)
Richaun Holmes (2018-2019)
M. J. Walker (2021-2022)
T. J. Warren (2023-)

22
Johnny High (1979–1981)
Larry Nance (1981–1988)
Danny Ainge (1992–1995)
John Wallace (2001–2002)
Brevin Knight (2003)
James Jones (2005–2007)
Matt Barnes (2008–2009)
Zabian Dowdell (2011)
Michael Redd (2012)
Miles Plumlee (2013-2015)
Elijah Millsap (2017)
Deandre Ayton (2018–)

23
Bob Warlick (1968–1969)
Art Harris (1969–1972)
Paul Stovall (1972–1973)
Mike Bratz (1977–1980)
Tyrone Corbin (1988–1989)
Tim Legler (1990)
Cedric Ceballos (1990–1994)
Wayman Tisdale (1994–1997)
Paul McPherson (2000–2001)
Casey Jacobsen (2002–2005)
Sharrod Ford (2005)
Jason Richardson (2008-2010)
Marcus Thornton (2015)
John Jenkins (2016-2017)
Danuel House (2017-2018)
Eric Moreland (2018-2019)
Cameron Johnson (2019-2023)

24
Joe Reeves (1973)
Bill Chamberlain (1974)
Greg Jackson (1975)
Garfield Heard (1976–1980)
Dennis Johnson (1980–1983)
Jay Humphries (1984–1988)
Danny Schayes (1994–1995)
Tom Chambers (1988–1993) (number retired)
Tom Gugliotta (1999–2004)

25
Gail Goodrich (1968–1970)
Gary Melchionni (1973–1975)
John Wetzel (1970–1973) (1975–1976)
Greg Griffin (1977–1979)
Craig Hodges (1988)
T.R. Dunn (1989)
Oliver Miller (1992–1994)
Robert Horry (1996–1997)
Don MacLean (2000)
Jake Tsakalidis (2000–2003)
Vince Carter (2010-2011)
Dionte Christmas (2013-2014)
Reggie Bullock (2015)
Phil Pressey (2016)
Alec Peters (2017-2018)
Mikal Bridges (2018–2023)

26
Bill Martin (1987)
Jud Buechler (2001)
Shannon Brown (2011-2013)
Ray Spalding (2019)
Emanuel Terry (2021-2022)

27
Malcolm Mackey (1993–1994)
Tony Dumas (1996–1997)

28
Andrew Lang (1988–1992)

29
Paul Silas (1969–1972)
Alando Tucker (2007–2009)

30
Fred Saunders (1974–1976)
Ron Lee (1976–1979)
Nick Vanos (1985–1987)
Clifford Robinson (1997–2001)
Maciej Lampe (2004–2005)
Earl Barron (2010, 2015)
Jon Leuer (2015-2016)
Troy Daniels (2017-2019)
Damian Jones (2020-2021)
Paris Bass (2021-2022)

31
Jim Fox (1968–1970)
Mel Counts (1970–1972)
Walt Wesley (1972–1973)
Bob Christian (1973–1974)
Kurt Rambis (1989–1992)
Shawn Marion (1999–2008)
Gani Lawal (2010-2011)
Sebastian Telfair (2011-2012)
Jarell Eddie (2017)

32
Nate Hawthorne (1974–1976)
Ira Terrell (1976–1978)
Charles Pittman (1982–1986)
Mike Morrison (1989–1990)
Negele Knight (1990–1993)
Jason Kidd (1996–2001)
Amar'e Stoudemire (2002–2006)
Shaquille O'Neal (2008–2009)
Taylor Griffin (2009-2010)
Brandan Wright (2015)
Davon Reed (2017–2018)
Jimmer Fredette (2019)

33
Charlie Scott (1972–1975)
Alvan Adams (1975–1988) (number retired)
Grant Hill (2007-2012) (number used with Adams' permission)

34
McCoy McLemore (1968)
Otto Moore (1971–1972)
John Shumate (1974–1976)
Charles Jones (1984–1986)
Tim Perry (1988–1992)
Charles Barkley (1992–1996) (number retired)
Antonio McDyess (1997–1998)
Chris Morris (1999)

35
Bayard Forrest (1976–1980)
Craig Dykema (1981–1982)
Armon Gilliam (1987–1989)
Xavier McDaniel (1990–1991)
Joe Kleine (1993–1997) (1999)
Mirza Teletović (2015–2016)
Dragan Bender (2016–2019)
Chandler Hutchison (2021-2022)
Kevin Durant (2023-)

36
No players

37
No players

38
Saben Lee (2023-)

39
No players

40
Stan McKenzie (basketball) (1968–1970)
Joe Thomas (1970–1971)
Mike Bantom (1973–1975)
Ricky Sobers (1975–1977)
Mike Niles (1980–1981)
David Thirdkill (1982–1983)
Mike McGee (1990)
Joe Courtney (1993–1994)
John Coker (1995–1996)
Loren Meyer (1996–1997)
Corie Blount (1999–2001)
Kurt Thomas (2005–2007)
Luke Zeller (2012)
Anthony Tolliver (2014)

41
Neal Walk (1969–1974)
Mark West (1988–1994) (1999–2000)
Lorenzo Brown (2016)
Tariq Owens (2020)

42
Connie Hawkins (1969–1973) (number retired)

43
David Lattin (1968–1969)
Michael Young (1984)
Mark Davis (1988–1989)
Chris Carr (1995–1996)
Ben Davis (1996–1997) (1999–2000)
Jake Voskuhl (2001–2005)
Linton Johnson (2008)
Shavlik Randolph (2014-2015)
Kris Humphries (2016)
Jonah Bolden (2020)

44
Gary Gregor (1968–1969)
Jerry Chambers (1969–1970)
Greg Howard (1970–1971)
Paul Westphal (1975–1980) (1983–1984) (number retired)
Kenny Gattison (1986–1987) (1988–1989)

45
Jim Owens (1973–1975)
Jeff Cook (1979–1983) (1987–1988)
Ed Nealy (1988–1992)
A. C. Green (1993–1996)
Mike Brown (1998)
Bo Outlaw (2001–2003)
Steven Hunter (2004–2005)
Justin Jackson (2022)

46
Bo Outlaw (2004–2005)
Aron Baynes (2019-2020)

47
Scott Williams (2002–2004)

48
No players

49
No players

50
Joel Kramer (1978–1983)
William Bedford (1986–1987)
Eddie House (2005–2006)

51
Ian Lockhart (1990)
Stefano Rusconi (1995–1996)

52
Chucky Brown (1996)
Eric Piatkowski (2006–2008)
Jordan McRae (2016)

53
Rich Kelley (1980–1982)
James Edwards (1983–1988)
Ron Moore (1988)

54
Dale Schlueter (1976–1977)
Ed Pinckney (1985–1987)
Rodney Rogers (1999–2002)
Brian Skinner (2007–2008)

55
Earl Williams (1974–1975)
Daniel Santiago (2000–2001)
Jahidi White (2003–2004)
Brian Grant (2005–2006)
Earl Clark (2009–2010)
Viacheslav Kravtsov (2013–2014)
Cory Jefferson (2015-2016)
Mike James (2017)
E'Twaun Moore (2020-2021)
Darius Bazley (2023-)

56
No players

57
No players

58
No players

59
No players

60
No players

61
No players

62
No players

63
No players

64
No players

65
No players

66
No players

67
No players

68
No players

69
No players

70
No players

71
No players

72
No players

73
No players

74
No players

75
No players

76
No players

77
No players

78
No players

79
No players

80
No players

81
No players

82
No players

83
No players

84
No players

85
No players

86
No players

87
No players

88
No players

89
No players

90
No players

91
No players

92
No players

93
No players

94
No players

95
No players

96
No players

97
No players

98
Hamed Haddadi (2013)

99
Jae Crowder (2020-2023)

Phoenix Suns